Starodonskoy is a rural locality (a khutor) in Ozerskoye Rural Settlement, Ilovlinsky District, Volgograd Oblast, Russia. The population was 31 as of 2010. There are 4 streets.

Geography 
Starodonskoy is located in steppe, on the Don River, on south of the Volga Upland, 43 km west of Ilovlya (the district's administrative centre) by road. Beluzhino-Koldairov is the nearest rural locality.

References 

Rural localities in Ilovlinsky District